Derrymeeleen (Irish: Doire Mhaolín) is a townland in the civil parish of Desertserges, County Cork, Ireland.  The total population in 2011 for this townland was 70, of which males numbered 40 and females were 30. The total housing stock was 21 of which vacant households numbered 0.  It is situated at a height of more than 100 metres above the River Bandon.

See also 
 List of townlands of the Barony of East Carbery (East_Division)

External links 
 Photograph of farmhouse and farm buildings.

References

Townlands of County Cork